Cornelis Verelst (1667?–1734) was an 18th-century flower painter from the Northern Netherlands.

Biography
It is not clear if Verelst was born in Amsterdam as no baptismal record survived. He was the son of Herman and brother of Maria Verelst.

He is known for flower still lifes in the manner of his uncle Simon Verelst.  He died in London.

Family tree

References

External links

1667 births
1734 deaths
18th-century Dutch painters
18th-century Dutch male artists
Dutch male painters
Painters from Amsterdam
Flower artists